Bikh may refer to:
 Bikh, Bastak
 Bikh - a poison extracted from certain plants of the genus Aconitum.